Patricia Allison (born 7 December 1994) is an English actress. Following a string of guest appearances on television, she landed her first major role as Ola Nyman on the Netflix comedy-drama series Sex Education (2019–2021).

Early life
At the age of ten, she appeared in a production of Oliver Twist at the Royal Opera House.
After leaving school, she studied musical theatre for two years at the Colchester Institute, followed by a four-year course at the East 15 Acting School in Loughton, Essex where she graduated with a Bachelor of Arts in Acting.

Career 
In 2018, Allison played a minor role as Marguerite in the BBC miniseries Les Misérables, before being introduced as Ola Nyman in the Netflix comedy-drama series Sex Education in 2019. In 2020, her role was promoted to a main character.

Filmography

Film

Television

References

External links

1994 births
21st-century English actresses
Actresses from London
Alumni of East 15 Acting School
English television actresses
Living people